Typhoon Paka, known in the Philippines as Typhoon Rubing, was the last tropical cyclone of the 1997 Pacific hurricane and typhoon season, and was among the strongest Pacific typhoons in the month of December. Paka, which is the Hawaiian name for Pat, developed on November 28 from a trough well to the southwest of Hawaii. The storm tracked generally westward for much of its duration, and on December 7 it crossed into the western Pacific Ocean. Much of its track was characterized by fluctuations in intensity, and on December 10 the cyclone attained typhoon status as it crossed the Marshall Islands. Subsequently, it underwent a steady weakening trend, and on December 23 Paka dissipated.

Typhoon Paka first impacted the Marshall Islands, where it dropped heavy rainfall and left  in damages. Later, it passed just north of Guam, where strong winds destroyed about 1,500 buildings and damaged 10,000 more; 5,000 people were left homeless, and the island experienced a complete power outage following the typhoon. Damage on the island totaled , which warranted the retirement of its name. Paka also caused minor damage in the Northern Mariana Islands, and overall, the typhoon did not cause any reported fatalities.

Meteorological history

As the weather synoptics of the northern Pacific Ocean transitioned into a late-fall to early winter-type pattern, convection from the monsoon trough extended to the east of the International Date Line. Operationally, the Central Pacific Hurricane Center (CPHC) did not begin issuing warnings on the system until December 2.

The tropical depression continued drifting north-northeastward, and failed to strengthen significantly. It turned to the west on December 1, due to the presence of a strong anticyclone to its north with a ridge extending westward past the International Date Line. Due to the presence of high clouds across the area, forecasters had difficulty at times in locating the low-level circulation. After becoming a tropical storm, Paka remained nearly stationary for about two days before resuming a slow motion to the west-southwest. The next day, however, it encountered dry air and began weakening; by December 6, the winds had decreased to minimal tropical storm status for about 12 hours.

Upon entering the western North Pacific Ocean, tropical cyclone warning duties transferred from the CPHC to the Japan Meteorological Agency (JMA), and the JMA first assessed Paka as a  storm. The Joint Typhoon Warning Center (JTWC) unofficially assumed warning duties for interests in the United States Department of Defense. Paka continued to intensify after crossing the date line, and from late on December 7 through early the following day it remained a strong tropical storm. However, upper-level wind shear increased, and it again weakened. At 1200 UTC on December 9, the JTWC assessed Paka as an  tropical storm and forecast it to continue weakening. By December 10, the shear had begun to decrease as the storm moved through the Marshall Islands, and that night the JTWC upgraded Paka to typhoon status.

Subsequently, it briefly weakened as its forward motion increased. Additionally, satellite imagery indicated an eyewall mesovortex within the eye of the typhoon. It slowed and began to re-intensify as it continued westward, and at 0530 UTC on December 16 the northern portion of the outer eyewall of Paka passed over the island of Rota; 20 minutes later, the southern portion of the inner wall cloud moved across northern Guam.

Early on December 18, the JTWC assessed it as attaining peak winds of  1 min winds). On December 19, it entered the area of responsibility of the Philippine Atmospheric, Geophysical and Astronomical Services Administration, or PAGASA, and was named Rubing. Shortly thereafter, Paka moved through an area of progressively increasing wind shear, which resulted in a steady weakening trend. By December 21, winds decreased to tropical storm status. The next day, it degenerated into a tropical depression before it dissipated on December 23.

Preparations and impact

Marshall Islands
Prior to the typhoon passing through the Marshall Islands, several hundred residents on the island of Ebeye fled to safer structures. The threat of Paka prevented Continental Micronesia from flying in or out of the area.

Paka entered the Marshall Islands between Mili and Majuro as a tropical storm on December 10, and after strengthening into a typhoon, it left the archipelago on December 14. On Jaluit Atoll, the typhoon dropped  of precipitation in six hours, with a total of about  recorded in 30 hours. Strong waves inundated low-lying islands, which flooded crops with salt water. The combination of the wind and flooding caused severe damage to banana, papaya, and lime trees across the territory. Typhoon Paka damaged 70% of the houses on Ailinglaplap Atoll, and most of the coconut trees on the atoll were left toppled or damaged. Strong winds left large portions of Ebeye island without electricity or telephone.

Guam

The Guam National Weather Service issued a typhoon watch on December 14, which was upgraded to a typhoon warning the next day. The Antonio B. Won Pat International Airport was closed during the passage of Paka, with only emergency flights permitted.

Passing a short distance north of the island, Typhoon Paka produced strong winds across northern Guam, though reliable wind reports are incomplete due to the long duration and intensity of the winds. The highest reading believed to be reliable was at Apra Harbor. There, a station recorded a wind gust of  before the sensor failed as winds shifted to the southwest; since the winds from the southwest were stronger and of greater duration, officials believe gusts there reached . However, a subsequent wind survey of the area discarded the reading at the base, as it was considered unreliable.

The strong winds from Paka left around 1,500 buildings destroyed on the island, of which 1,160 were single-family homes. A further 10,000 buildings sustained damage to some degree, with 60% of the homes on the island reporting major damage. In all, about 5,000 people were left homeless due to the typhoon. Additionally, an estimated 30–40% of the public buildings received major damage. Buildings on the island made of reinforced concrete fared well, as opposed to light metal-frame structures, which more often than not were destroyed. Large tourist hotels near Hagåtña, on which Guam is dependent, received generally minor damage, such as broken windows and damaged power generators.

Following the passage of the typhoon, 25% of the homes on Guam were left without water. Telephone service remained working after the storm, due to most lines being underground. Strong waves washed away a few coastal roads in the northern portion of the island, leaving them temporarily closed. The waves surpassed the seawall at Apra Harbor, damaging the road and infrastructure of the seaport; many boats were washed ashore after breaking from their moorings. Strong winds damaged a radar system and lights along the runway of the Antonio B. Won Pat International Airport, though most airport facilities received light damage. Andersen Air Force Base also sustained heavy damage, with hundreds of downed trees and many facilities left damaged. About 100 people were injured, but the typhoon caused no deaths on the island.

Northern Mariana Islands
A typhoon watch was issued for Rota, Tinian, and Saipan on December 14, which was upgraded to a typhoon warning the next day. Because Paka was intensifying while passing to the south of Rota, the first wind, or northeast through east winds, was less severe than the second wind from the southeast. Sustained winds on the island reached , with gusts reaching . Many trees in the mountainous portion of the island were left defoliated, which limited nesting and foraging sites for the endangered bridled white-eye bird. While passing to the south of the island, Paka dropped  of rain. Damage on the island totaled $4.4 million (1997 USD, $6.4 million 2015 USD). The typhoon also produced above-normal precipitation on Saipan.

Aftermath
Following the passage of the typhoon in the Ailinglaplap Atoll in the Marshall Islands, residents experienced severe food shortages due to damaged crops and little rainfall. Experts estimated the entire redevelopment of its fauna would require more than a decade. As a result of the crop shortage, large-scale evacuations of the islands' residents were considered. Officials in the nation requested assistance from the Federal Emergency Management Agency of the United States, and on March 20, 1998, the area was declared a disaster area; the declaration allowed for the usage of emergency funds.

On December 17, 1997, President Bill Clinton declared Guam a federal disaster area, making it eligible for federal assistance. One week later, a disaster declaration was ordered for the Northern Mariana Islands. Ultimately, FEMA received 14,770 Individual Assistance Applications from residents on Guam. In turn, FEMA provided the residents with over $27 million in assistance (1997 USD, $39 million 2015 USD). The entire island of Guam was left without power after Paka. Water and sewage systems on Guam were directly affected minimally by the typhoon. With the usage of power generators, most areas of the island had water pumping capabilities within a few days after the typhoon. The Antonio B. Won Pat International Airport was partially reopened to daytime flights a day after the typhoon, and by a week after the passage of Paka the airport was fully re-opened.

Retirement
Due to the severe damage from the typhoon, the Central Pacific Hurricane Center requested the retirement of the name in April 2006; the name Paka was replaced with Pama.

See also

 1997–98 El Niño event
 List of off-season Pacific hurricanes
 Typhoon Gay (1992)
 Typhoon Keith

References

External links

JMA General Information of Typhoon Paka (9728) from Digital Typhoon
JMA Best Track Data (Graphics) of Typhoon Paka (9728)
JMA Best Track Data (Text)
05C.PAKA from the U.S. Naval Research Laboratory
 Super Typhoon Paka's Surface Winds Over Guam
 Damage images of Typhoon Paka on Guam

Retired Pacific hurricanes
1997 Pacific hurricane season
1997 Pacific typhoon season
Eastern Pacific tropical storms
Typhoons in Guam
Typhoons in the Northern Mariana Islands
Typhoons
1997 disasters in the Philippines
Typhoons in the Philippines
Typhoons in the Federated States of Micronesia
Typhoons in the Marshall Islands
Off-season Eastern Pacific tropical cyclones
November 1997 events
December 1997 events